Wynand is a given name. Notable people with the name include:

Wynand Claassen (born 1951), South African rugby player
Wynand Havenga (born 1965), South African darts player
Wynand Louw (born 1961), Namibian cricket umpire
Wynand Malan (born 1943), liberal Afrikaner South African politician
Wynand Olivier (born 1983), South African rugby union footballer

de:Paul Wynand